Gülşen Degener (born 25 October 1968, in Şanlıurfa) is a female Turkish-born, Germany-resident professional carom billiards player.

Career

Gülşen Degener was born in Şanlıurfa, southeastern Turkey on October 25, 1968. She began playing billiards while she was at Uludağ University in Bursa, Turkey, studying English philology and literature. After graduation, she served four years in Istanbul and three years in Berlin, Germany as a teacher for English language. During her stay in the Netherlands, she played in the Dutch Billiards League. In the summer of 2013, she quit her profession as a teacher in Germany, which she had taken a break as she received an offer in the Netherlands to switch over to professional billiards player.

She has been playing billiards for 10 years, the last 4 years professionally. After mastering straight rail billiards, she switched over to three-cushion, a more difficult variety.

In the mid-1990s, Gülşen moved to Berlin, Germany. In 1999, she played for a leading Dutch first division ladies team, Tabara. In the 2002–2003 season, she played for the German second division team BSG Duisburg, before joining the Portuguese first division team Centro Norton de Matos for the 2005–2006 season.

In 2015, Degener won once again the Turkish champion title. She became runners-up at the 2015 CEB European Championships held in Brandenburg, Germany. She repeated her achievement as runners-up at the 2016 CEB European Women's Three-cushion Cup held in the Netherlands on June 17–19, 2016 after losing to the world champion Dutch Therese Klompenhouwer by 30-16 in the finals.

She was awarded the "Best Female Three-cushion Billiards Player 2016" by the Turkish Billiards Federation.

Degener currently resides in Germany and is married and has a child.

Achievements

Records 
Highest series for women
 10 – 2004 Dutch league

Highest game average for women
 1.400 – 2004 Dutch league
 1.500 – 2005 European Women’s Championship 3-Cushion, Manisa, Turkey

References

External links 
 Official website  
 News about Gülşen Degener 

Living people
1968 births
Sportspeople from Şanlıurfa
Bursa Uludağ University alumni
Turkish schoolteachers
Turkish sportswomen
Female cue sports players
Turkish carom billiards players
Turkish diaspora in Germany
German carom billiards players
German people of Turkish descent
Turkish expatriate sportspeople in the Netherlands